"Bulat Ati Ku" is a song by the Iban rock band Masterpiece. It was included on their debut album, Merindang Ke Bintang and released through Panggau Buluh Pengerindu Records in 2009. "Bulat Ati Ku" has earned the band 'Best Music Video' award at the 2010 AMD 2010 music awards.

Track listing
 "Bulat Ati Ku" (Album Version) - 4:18

Music video

The music video (directed by Harry Frederick) were filmed with two scenes in Sibu,  features the band performing on a rooftop of a building and combines with the scene when  Depha on a bike while all four members—as a group—were driving a cars on Durin highway. The video was shot in two days.

References

External links
 Lyrics of this song on Lirik Lagu Iban
 Guitar chord of this song on Chordify

2008 songs
Masterpiece (band) songs
2009 singles